Leonard Day (24 December 1859 – 25 April 1943) was an English cricketer. He played for Gloucestershire between 1880 and 1882.

References

1859 births
1943 deaths
English cricketers
Gloucestershire cricketers
Cricketers from York
English cricketers of 1864 to 1889